The women's 100 metre freestyle competition of the swimming events at the 1955 Pan American Games took place on 23 March. The last Pan American Games champion was Sharon Geary of US.

This race consisted of two lengths of the pool, both lengths being in freestyle.

Results
All times are in minutes and seconds.

Heats

Final 
The final was held on March 23.

References

Swimming at the 1955 Pan American Games
Pan